The Vítor Hugo Cup is a basketball competition organized by the Portuguese Basketball Federation.

Taça Vítor Hugo winners

References

External links
 History

Women's basketball cup competitions in Portugal
Portugal